The 1999–2000 AHL season was the 64th season of the American Hockey League. Nineteen teams played 80 games each in the schedule. The Hartford Wolf Pack finished first overall in the regular season, and won their first Calder Cup championship.

Team changes
 The Adirondack Red Wings ceased operations.
 The Beast of New Haven ceased operations.
 The Fredericton Canadiens moved to Quebec City, Quebec, becoming the Quebec Citadelles, playing in the Atlantic division.
 The Louisville Panthers joined the AHL as an expansion team, based in Louisville, Kentucky, playing in the Mid-Atlantic division.
 The dormant Cornwall Aces resumed operations as the Wilkes-Barre/Scranton Penguins, based in the greater Wilkes-Barre/Scranton area in Pennsylvania, playing in the Empire State division.
 The Portland Pirates switched divisions from Atlantic to New England

Final standings
Note: GP = Games played; W = Wins; L = Losses; T = Ties; OTL = Overtime losses; GF = Goals for; GA = Goals against; Pts = Points;

Eastern Conference

Western Conference

Scoring leadersNote: GP = Games played; G = Goals; A = Assists; Pts = Points; PIM = Penalty minutes''

 complete list

Calder Cup playoffs

All Star Classic
The 13th AHL All-Star Game was played on January 17, 2000, at the Blue Cross Arena in Rochester, New York. Team Canada defeated Team PlanetUSA 8-3. In the skills competition held the day before the All-Star Game, Team PlanetUSA won 17-12 over Team Canada.

Trophy and award winners

Team awards

Individual awards

Other awards

See also
List of AHL seasons

References
AHL official site
AHL Hall of Fame
HockeyDB

  
American Hockey League seasons
2
2